Saramandaia is a Brazilian telenovela produced and broadcast by TV Globo. It premiered on 24 June 2013 and ended on 27 September 2013. It's the third "novela das onze" to be aired on the timeslot.

It is based on a telenovela of the same name created by Dias Gomes. Written by Ricardo Linhares in collaboration with Nelson Nadotti, Ana Maria Moretzsohn and João Brandão.

Starring Lilia Cabral, José Mayer, Débora Bloch, Gabriel Braga Nunes, Sérgio Guizé, Leandra Leal, Matheus Nachtergaele, and Fernanda Montenegro.

Cast

Audience

Ratings

References

External links 
 

Brazilian telenovelas
TV Globo telenovelas
2013 telenovelas
2013 Brazilian television series debuts
2013 Brazilian television series endings
Brazilian LGBT-related television shows
Portuguese-language telenovelas